Kermit Roosevelt (1889–1943),was an explorer, author, and soldier; second son of U.S. President Theodore Roosevelt.

Kermit Roosevelt may also refer to:

 Kermit Roosevelt Jr. (1916–2000), CIA officer; eldest son of Kermit Roosevelt
 Kermit Roosevelt III (born 1971), law professor and author; grandson of Kermit Roosevelt Jr.

See also
 Edith Roosevelt (Edith Kermit Carow Roosevelt, 1861–1948), second wife of U.S. President Theodore Roosevelt